Jessica Bießmann is a member of the Abgeordnetenhaus of Berlin (house of representatives) and member of the Alternative for Germany party.

In 2018 she was suspended from the party after pictures emerged of her posing in front of wine bottles depicting Adolf Hitler, however the following year party officials limited measures against her to a warning.

References

Living people
Year of birth missing (living people)
Alternative for Germany politicians
Members of the Abgeordnetenhaus of Berlin
21st-century German women politicians